The Films of Princess Fantoche is a 1921 Austrian silent film directed by Max Neufeld and starring Liane Haid and Hermann Benke.

Cast

References

Bibliography

External links

1921 films
Austrian silent feature films
Films directed by Max Neufeld
Austrian black-and-white films